Congregation Ahavath Beth Israel is a synagogue in Boise, Idaho.  Its 1896 building is amongst the oldest synagogues in continuous use west of the Mississippi River. The congregation is affiliated with the Union for Reform Judaism.

History

Boise's first Jews were present in the mining camps in the 1860s, but it was not until 1895 that a Congregation Beth Israel (Hebrew for "House of Israel") was formed. Most of the congregants were from Germany and Central Europe and the synagogue followed Reformed ritual. Moses Alexander, mayor of Boise and governor of Idaho, was an early leader of the congregation.

The building was erected in 1896, and given a careful restoration in 1982.

Congregation Ahavath Israel (Hebrew for "Love of Israel") was founded in 1912 by Orthodox immigrants from Eastern Europe.  The congregation erected a building  at the corner of 27th and Bannock Streets in 1947. The two congregations merged in 1986 to become Ahavath Beth Israel (Hebrew for "Love of the House of Israel").

A personal memoir/history of Congregation Ahavath Israel was written by one of its member leaders, the late Mr. Joel Stone; a copy of this book is obtainable through the congregation's lending library.  A more comprehensive history of Ahavath Beth Israel (which focuses more on Beth Israel's history) was also privately published for limited release by a former member, and is likewise available through the congregation.

Building

The synagogue's wood-shingled 1896 building blends two architecture styles popular with turn-of-the-century Jewish congregations. The exterior is in mainly in the popular Rundbogenstil style, though the tall windows flanking the large, rose window are in the form of Horseshoe arches.  This Moorish Revival detail continues on the inside, where the Barrel-vaulted ceiling is supported by horseshoe arches. The architect described the building as designed in a modern Moorish style.

In 1972 the synagogue was added to the National Register of Historic Places. In 2003 the building was moved from its original location on State Street to its current location on Latah Street. During the move documentation was discovered showing the original construction was partially financed by Marshall Field and Levi Strauss & Co.

References

External links

Ahavath Beth Israel

1895 establishments in Idaho
Ashkenazi Jewish culture in the United States
Ashkenazi synagogues
Buildings and structures in Boise, Idaho
German-American culture in Idaho
German-Jewish culture in the United States
Jewish organizations established in 1912
Jews and Judaism in Idaho
Moorish Revival architecture in Idaho
Moorish Revival synagogues
National Register of Historic Places in Boise, Idaho
Properties of religious function on the National Register of Historic Places in Idaho
Religious organizations established in 1895
Relocated buildings and structures in Idaho
Rundbogenstil synagogues
Synagogues completed in 1896
Tourist attractions in Boise, Idaho